Nadine Ernsting-Krienke (born 5 February 1974 in Telgte, North Rhine-Westphalia) is a field hockey striker from Germany, who won the gold medal with the women's national team at the 2004 Summer Olympics in Athens, Greece. She is one of the most decorated field hockey players in Germany, having played in four consecutive Summer Olympic Games, starting in 1992. She retired from international play in 2009, after having represented Germany 360 times, scoring 137 goals.

Since 1989 she has been playing for Eintracht Braunschweig in Bundesliga.

International senior tournaments
 1990 – World Cup, Sydney (8th place)
 1991 – Champions Trophy, Berlin (2nd place)
 1991 – European Championship, Brussels (2nd place)
 1992 – Summer Olympics, Barcelona (2nd place)
 1993 – Champions Trophy, Amstelveen (3rd place)
 1994 – World Cup, Dublin (4th place)
 1995 – European Championship, Amstelveen (3rd place)
 1995 – Champions Trophy, Mar del Plata (4th place)
 1995 – Olympic Qualifying Tournament, Cape Town (3rd place)
 1996 – Summer Olympics, Atlanta (6th place)
 1997 – Champions Trophy, Berlin (2nd place)
 1998 – European Indoor Nations Cup, Orense (1st place)
 1998 – World Cup, Utrecht (3rd place)
 1999 – Champions Trophy, Brisbane (3rd place)
 1999 – European Championship, Cologne (2nd place)
 2000 – Olympic Qualifying Tournament, Milton Keynes (3rd place)
 2000 – Champions Trophy, Amstelveen (2nd place)
 2000 – Summer Olympics, Sydney (7th place)
 2002 – European Indoor Nations Cup, France (1st place)
 2002 – World Cup, Perth (7th place)
 2003 – World Indoor Nations Cup, Leipzig (1st place)
 2003 – Champions Challenge, Catania (1st place)
 2003 – European Championship, Barcelona (3rd place)
 2004 – Olympic Qualifier, Auckland (4th place)
 2004 – Summer Olympics, Athens (1st place)
 2004 – Champions Trophy, Rosario (2nd place)
 2005 – Champions Trophy, Canberra (5th place)
 2006 – Champions Trophy, Amstelveen (1st place)
 2006 – World Cup, Madrid (8th)
 2007 – Champions Trophy, Quilmes (3rd place)

References

External links
 
 Profile on Hockey Olympia

1974 births
Living people
People from Warendorf (district)
Sportspeople from Münster (region)
German female field hockey players
Olympic field hockey players of Germany
Field hockey players at the 1992 Summer Olympics
Field hockey players at the 1996 Summer Olympics
Field hockey players at the 2000 Summer Olympics
Field hockey players at the 2004 Summer Olympics
Olympic gold medalists for Germany
Olympic silver medalists for Germany
Olympic medalists in field hockey
Medalists at the 2004 Summer Olympics
Medalists at the 1992 Summer Olympics